The Place of Dead Roads is a 1983 novel by William S. Burroughs, the second book of the trilogy that begins with Cities of the Red Night (1981) and concludes with The Western Lands (1987). It chronicles the story of a gay gunfighter in the American West, beginning with the gunfighter's death in 1899, incorporates contrasting themes and time travel episodes, and makes use of Burroughs’ extensive knowledge of firearms. Non-linear in construction, it makes use of vivid imagery and repetition but does not employ the famous “cut-up” method of literary collage used in his earlier novels.

1983 American novels
1980s LGBT novels
Nonlinear narrative novels
Novels by William S. Burroughs
Novels with gay themes
Viking Press books